WHKX is a country-formatted broadcast radio station licensed to Bluefield, Virginia, serving Bluefield, Tazewell, and Bland in Virginia and Bluefield and Princeton in West Virginia. WHKX is owned and operated by Charles Spencer and Rick Lambert, through licensee First Media Services, LLC.

History
106.3 FM in this region launched as WOVE-FM, the FM counterpart of WOVE (1340 AM), in 1966. In 1969, Kenneth J. Crosthwaite, who had owned WOVE, acquired the station, changed the call letters to WKJC and was approved to change its city of license from Welch, West Virginia, to Bluefield.

References

External links
  - Kicks Country Online
 

1966 establishments in Virginia
Country radio stations in the United States
Radio stations established in 1966
HKX